The 2014–15 Copa del Rey was the 5th staging of the Copa del Rey de Futsal. The competition began on 23 and 24 September 2013 with First round matches. The Final took place on 2 May at Pabellón Diego Calvo Valera, in Águilas, Region of Murcia.

Barcelona Alusport is the defending champion after winning its fourth title in previous edition but will not able to defend its title after they were defeated in Semifinals to Inter Movistar.

In the Final, Inter Movistar won 3–0 to Marfil Santa Coloma clinching its first Copa del Rey title.

Calendar

Qualified teams
16 teams of Primera División
12 teams of Segunda División
20 teams of Segunda División B

First round
Draw was held on Saturday, 6 September. Matches played on 23–27 September 2014.

All times are CEST.

|}

Second round
Draw took place on 26 September at RFEF headquarters. Draw included ten winners from the first round plus all Primera División and 10 remaining Segunda División teams.

Matches played on 13–15 October 2014.

|}

Round of 16
Round of 16 draw took place on 21 October at RFEF headquarters. This round draw includes the 16 winners from the Round of 32 which in summary are 10 teams from Primera División, 3 from Segunda División and 3 from Segunda División B.

Matches to be played on 4 and 5 November 2014.

All times are CET.

|}

Matches

Quarter finals
Quarter-finals draw took place on 12 November 2014, at the RFEF headquarters.

Matches to be played on 9/10 December 2014.

All times are CET.

|}

Matches

Semi finals
Semi-finals draw to be held on 18 December 2014, at the RFEF headquarters.

First leg matches to be played on 14 January 2015 and second leg on 4 February.

All times are CET.

|}

Matches

1st leg

2nd leg

Final
The final was played on 2 May at the Pabellón Diego Calvo Valera in Águilas, Region of Murcia.

See also
2014–15 Primera División de Futsal
2014 Copa de España de Futsal

References

External links
lnfs.es

Copa del Rey de Futsal seasons
Copa
Fut